The 38 cm schwerer Ladungswerfer (38 cm sLdgW) was a spigot mortar used by Germany during World War II. It was used by engineers to demolish obstacles and strongpoints. It proved to be too heavy for its role and it was gradually withdrawn from front-line service.

Propellant was placed at the top of the spigot and ignited when the projectile slid far enough down the spigot to complete the electrical circuit. The spigot mortar was mounted on a traversing bracket on a drum-shaped platform that was staked to the ground. It fired HE and smoke rounds.

External links 
 mortar page from TM-E 30-451 Handbook on German Military Forces on Lone Sentry
 Allied intelligence report on 38 cm ammunition on Lone Sentry

Sources
 Gander, Terry and Chamberlain, Peter. Weapons of the Third Reich: An Encyclopedic Survey of All Small Arms, Artillery and Special Weapons of the German Land Forces 1939-1945. New York: Doubleday, 1979 

Spigot mortars
World War II mortars of Germany
380 mm artillery